SM U-42 was a  Pacinotti-class submarine laid down on 18 August 1913 in Italy at Società FIAT-San Giorgio, Muggiano, La Spezia. Ordered by the Imperial German Navy the submarine was confiscated by the Italian government on 8 August 1915 after entering war with the Austria-Hungary. Commissioned as Balilla into the Regia Marina the submarine was sunk off Lissa by Austro-Hungarian torpedo boats 65 T and 66 T.

See also
 Balilla class submarine

External links
 Balilla (1913) Marina Militare website
 Classe Pacinotti Marina Militare website 

World War I submarines of Italy
World War I submarines of Germany
1915 ships
World War I shipwrecks in the Adriatic Sea
Ships built in La Spezia